The Mazda Suitcase Car was a prototype suitcase vehicle created in 1991 by the Mazda company. The suitcase opened up to reveal a functioning three-wheeled gasoline-powered vehicle with working lights. The vehicle, which resembled a go-kart, was created by Mazda engineers and showcased in the United States and Europe at auto shows.

Background
The Mazda Suitcase Car never made it to production; it was built for car shows in Europe and the United States. The idea for the car came from Mazda engineer Yoshimi Kanemoto. In 1991 Kanemoto along with other Mazda engineers from an internal company research group, created the vehicle as a company contest called Fantasyard. The contest challenged employees to design a creative product which is a moving machine. The car had stubby handlebars with a twistgrip throttle like a motorcycle, and three wheels. In 1992 The Associated Press published a photo of a Mazda executive driving the suitcase car through Times Square ahead of the 16 April 1992 New York International Automobile Show.

Description
The design began with a Samsonite suitcase and a pocket bike. The power plant was a 33.6cc  two-stroke engine. There were slots in the case where the rear wheel axles could protrude and a slot through the case for a front wheel. The car was equipped with turn signals and brake lights. The car also had carpeting, disc brakes, headlights and a horn. No tools were needed to assemble the vehicle.

Legacy
There were only two known examples of the car but it is thought that there is only one Mazda Suitcase Car left. One of the prototype suitcase cars was accidentally destroyed after the 1991 Fantasyard event.

References

External links
Video A Car That Fits in a Suitcase

1990s cars
Cars introduced in 1991
Convertibles
Rear-wheel-drive vehicles
Mazda vehicles
Mazda concept vehicles
Prototypes